The Bombay Bicycle Club is a restaurant chain that has multiple restaurants in many locations across the United States, including California. It originated as an Indian restaurant chain.

The Bombay Bicycle Club was the inspiration for the investment club known as the Billionaire Boys Club, whose founder, Joe Hunt, liked to hang out at the restaurant in Chicago in his youth.

The Bombay Bicycle Club was also the inspiration behind the English indie rock band of the same name.

Some chains of this restaurant also serve as bars.

References

Restaurant chains in the United States
Indian-American culture
Indian restaurants in the United States